Polemon griseiceps, or the Cameroon snake-eater, is a species of rear-fanged venomous snake in the subfamily Aparallactinae. The species is endemic to Middle Africa.

Geographic range
Polemon griseiceps is found in Cameroon, the Central African Republic, and the Republic of the Congo.

References

Further reading
Laurent RF (1947). "Notes sur quelques reptiles appartenant a la collection du Musée Royalle d'Histoire Naturelle de Belgique ". Bull. Mus. Hist. Nat. Belgique 23 (16): 1–12. (Miodon griseiceps, new species). (in French).

Atractaspididae
Snakes of Africa
Reptiles of Cameroon
Reptiles of the Central African Republic
Reptiles of the Republic of the Congo
Reptiles described in 1947
Taxa named by Raymond Laurent